Heincke is a surname. Notable people with the surname include:

 Ernst Heincke (1931–2015), German born American sprint canoer
 Adolf Heincke (1901–1986), German politician (NSDAP)
 Friedrich Heincke (1852–1929), German zoologist and ichthyologist
 Hanswerner Heincke (1905–?), Germanist

See also 
 Heinke (disambiguation)

Surnames from given names